In enzymology, an isocitrate O-dihydroxycinnamoyltransferase is an enzyme that catalyzes the chemical reaction

caffeoyl-CoA + isocitrate  CoA + 2-caffeoylisocitrate

Thus, the two substrates of this enzyme are caffeoyl-CoA and isocitrate, whereas its two products are CoA and 2-caffeoylisocitrate.

This enzyme belongs to the family of transferases, specifically those acyltransferases transferring groups other than aminoacyl groups.  The systematic name of this enzyme class is caffeoyl-CoA:isocitrate 3-O-(3,4-dihydroxycinnamoyl)transferase.

References

 

EC 2.3.1
Enzymes of unknown structure